Dicheimarro is a community in the municipal unit of Tsotyli, western Kozani regional unit, itself in the Greek region of Macedonia.

References

Populated places in Kozani (regional unit)